St Peter's is the home of The Sir Tom Cowie Campus at the University of Sunderland on the north bank of the River Wear. It is named after the adjacent St Peter's Church, Monkwearmouth.

It is also the name of the Tyne and Wear Metro Station nearest to the campus, which is next to Wearmouth Bridge.

The campus is adjacent to some of the pieces of the St Peter's Riverside Sculpture Project. Pathways of Knowledge, a pile of books located outside of the University's library, was unveiled by Queen Elizabeth II in 1993. They are a reference to Bede and the Great Library of St Peter's.

References

University of Sunderland